Pazurgo is a word puzzle which normally takes the form of a rectangular grid with white and shaded squares.  Pazurgo includes elements from Crossword puzzles and Word Search puzzles, along with the addition of its own unique elements.

The goal is to solve each of the clues by finding the solution word in the grid by forming a chain linking the letters of the word together.  Once all of the solution word chains have been discovered, the remaining available letters form the solution to the Scramble clue, when those letters are unscrambled in the correct order.

History 
The idea for Pazurgo came to Jeremy L Graybill in 2003 while he was playing the piano one day.  The first book of Pazurgo puzzles Pazurgo The Amazing New Word Puzzle was published by Tuttle Publishing, with an international release date of September 10, 2010.  A Flash application for solving Pazurgo puzzles was created in 2009, and is available for use with some free puzzles at www.Pazurgo.com.  The Pazurgo trademark is held internationally by Graybill, and the puzzle design is patent pending.

Solving Pazurgo Puzzles

Instructions 
The steps for solving Pazurgo puzzles becomes intuitive while solving the initial puzzle.  Pattern recognition and logic skills used in Word Searches and Sudoku are useful in solving Pazurgo puzzles.
 The starting letters of each word are indicated within the grid.
 The word chains begin with one of the indicated starting letters, and each letter of the solution word chain is discovered in turn in a horizontal or vertical direction from the previous letter.
 A line is drawn linking two consecutive letters in a word, crossing out any letters of the puzzle which fall in between, and letters which are crossed out may no longer be used in a solution word.
 Each letter may only be used within a solution word, and any letters which are circled may not then be crossed out by a solution word chain.
 A solution word chain may cross over itself or over the chain of another solution, but a chain may not cross through the shaded squares.
 Once all of the solution word chains have been discovered, the remaining letters which are not circled or crossed out will form the solution to the "Scramble" clue, when those letters are unscrambled in the correct order.

Example 
In the basic example shown here:
 There are two clues to solve, and both solution words begin with the letter "H", as indicated by circled letters in the grid.
 Solving the first clue yields the five letter solution "HIPPO".  Within the grid, each of the starting letters is looked at, to discover the valid word chain for "HIPPO".  The chain is found by starting with the "H" in the top row, crossing out the "P" below it, and continuing in turn with the "I", "P", "P", and "O" as shown in the solution.
 Solving the second clue yields the five letter solution "HORSE".  The valid word chain for "HORSE" begins with the unused starting letter "H" in the second row.  The word chain then crosses over the word chain for "HIPPO", crosses out the "I", and continues on to the "O", "R", and "S" as shown in the solution.  The word chain then crosses over itself to add the final letter "E".
 Once the two words have been solved, the remaining letters which aren't a part of a word chain and aren't crossed out by a word chain, make up the solution to the Scramble clue, when they are unscrambled.  The letters "I", "S", and "H" are unscrambled to form the word "HIS".

Types of Puzzles

Themed Puzzles 
Many Pazurgo puzzles contain a "theme", and all of the clues and words within that puzzle belong to that theme.  As an example, the puzzle At the Zoo available at www.Pazurgo.com contains a theme of animals seen at the zoo, including:

CHEETAH

CROCODILE

GORILLA

POLARBEAR

Non-Themed Puzzles 
Many Pazurgo puzzles contain "random" clues and words, and the words do not all belong to a single theme.  The clues for this type of puzzle are similar in concept to many "non-themed" Crossword puzzles.  Non-Themed puzzles do not generally include a puzzle title.

References

External links 
 Official Site

Word puzzles